The Ata language, also known as Pele-Ata after its two dialects, or Wasi, is a Papuan language spoken on New Britain island, Papua New Guinea. It appears to be related to neighboring Anêm, and possibly also to Yélî Dnye in a proposed Yele-West New Britain family. There are about 2000 speakers.

Ata is spoken in West Pomio-Mamusi Rural LLG, East New Britain Province, and in Talasea District, West New Britain Province.

Dialects
According to Yanagida (2004), there are two dialects of Ata, a Lower dialect spoken in the lowlands and an Upper dialect spoken in the mountains. The Lower dialect is spoken in Bialla Rural LLG, West New Britain Province, while the Upper dialect is spoken mostly in West Pomio-Mamusi Rural LLG, East New Britain Province:

Lower dialect (in Bialla Rural LLG, West New Britain Province):
Kiava (Old Kiava)
Korovasi
Malasi
Milikina (Elobe)
Mulusi
Ole
Sale (Gogosi)
Sege
Silanga [settlement]

Upper dialect (in West Pomio-Mamusi Rural LLG, East New Britain Province, unless noted otherwise):
Sipa (Bauka), West New Britain
Uasilau [settlement], West New Britain
Kaikou
Lavugi
Luge, West New Britain
Ti
Yauyau
Kukulu

Both the lower and upper dialects are spoken in the settlement of Silanga.

There are some lexical differences between the dialects. Some examples are listed below.

{| 
! gloss !! Upper Ata !! Lower Ata
|-
| rain || uali || laʔiua
|-
| sweet potato || totoʔo || kelatu
|-
| cassava || mio || mio, mioxa
|-
| throw something || paxele || pei
|-
| yes || iou || ani
|-
| the day before yesterday || malakaumei || malaʔo
|-
| 2nd person dual independent pronoun || ngolou || ngongou
|-
| 3rd person dual independent pronoun || olou || ilou
|}

Phonology 
Phonology of the Ata language:

/s/ is pronounced as alveolo-palatal [ɕ] before /i/, /x/ is voiced as [ɣ] when occurring intervocalically.

A word-initial /i/ is realized as a [j], and a word-initial /u/ becomes a [w] when preceding /o/ or /ɑ/.

Noun classes
Ata makes use of noun classes, some of which are:
Class 1 nouns: stationary and function in a state of relative stagnancy
Class 2 nouns: portable and function in a state of relative motion
Class 3 nouns: relating to the body’s internal needs

Below are some Ata noun class paradigms, using the noun roots lavo’o ‘stone’ and lexe ‘song’ as examples:

{| 
! root !! lavo’o !! /stone/ !! ‘stone’
|-
| Class 1 || lavo'o-silo || /stone-my/ || ‘my stone to be used for a house’
|-
| Class 2 || lavo'o-xeni || /stone-my/ || ‘my stone to be used for breaking nuts’
|-
| Class 3 || lavo'o-xo || /stone-my/ || ‘my stone for a stone oven’
|}

{| 
! root !! lexe !! /song/ !! ‘song’
|-
| Class 1 || lexe-silo || /song-my/ || ‘a song to be sung for me’
|-
| Class 2 || lexe-xeni || /song-my/ || ‘the song I sing’
|-
| Class 3 || lexe-xo || /song-my/ || ‘the song about me’
|}

Vocabulary
Selected basic vocabulary items in Ata:

{| class="wikitable sortable"
! gloss !! Ata
|-
| bird || ngiala
|-
| blood || sialuxu
|-
| bone || xine
|-
| breast || susu
|-
| ear || sangalie
|-
| eat || ’ie
|-
| egg || atolu
|-
| eye || iei
|-
| fire || navu
|-
| give || iti; losie
|-
| go || lai
|-
| ground || lia
|-
| leg || tava'a
|-
| louse || meni
|-
| man || aliko
|-
| moon || so'io
|-
| name || uala
|-
| one || vile
|-
| road, path || vote'i
|-
| see || maisou
|-
| sky || loxotolo
|-
| stone || lavo'o
|-
| sun || aso
|-
| tongue || levexe
|-
| teeth || anaxu ilaanu (anaxu = 'mouth')
|-
| tree || aiinu; ovu
|-
| two || tamei
|-
| water || lexa
|-
| woman || sema
|}

See also
East Papuan languages

References

Further reading
 

West New Britain languages
Languages of East New Britain Province
Languages of West New Britain Province